Hermya is a genus of flies in the family Tachinidae.

Species
 Hermya beelzebul (Wiedemann, 1830)
 Hermya formosana Villeneuve, 1939
 Hermya micans (van der Wulp, 1881)
 Hermya nigra Sun, 1994
 Hermya surstylis Sun, 1994
 Hermya yaanna Sun, 1994

References

Tachinidae